The Zionist Congress was established in 1897 by Theodor Herzl as the supreme organ of the Zionist Organization (ZO) and its legislative authority. In 1960 the names were changed to World Zionist Congress ( HaKongres HaTsioni HaOlami) and World Zionist Organization (WZO), respectively. The World Zionist Organization elects the officers and decides on the policies of the WZO and the Jewish Agency, including "determining the allocation of funds." The first Zionist Congress was held in Basel, Switzerland in 1897.
Any Jew over age 18 who belongs to a Zionist association is eligible to vote, and the number of elected delegates to the Congress is 500. 38% of the delegates are allocated to Israel, 29% to the United States of America, and 33% to the remainder of the countries of the Diaspora. In addition there are about 100 delegates which are appointed by International Organizations (e.g. B'nai B'rith, see below) affiliated with WZO.

After the First Zionist Congress in 1897, the Zionist Congress met every year until 1901, then every second year from 1903 to 1913 and 1921 to 1939. Until 1946, the Congress was held every two years in various European cities, save for interruptions during the two World Wars. Their goal was to build an infrastructure to further the cause of Jewish settlement in Palestine. Since the Second World War, meetings have been held approximately every four years. Also, since the creation of the State of Israel, the Congress has met every four or five years in Jerusalem.

The 38th World Zionist Congress took place in 2020.

Representatives at the World Zionist Congress
The World Zionist Congress includes representatives of Zionist World Unions, Women's Zionist Organizations with Special Status and International Jewish Organizations.

Zionist World Unions
Zionist participants in the World Zionist Congress are free to form Brit Olamit or Zionist World Unions (ideological groupings), which are somewhat like political parties. While Israeli political parties can participate in the Congress, brits are also organized and voted into the Congress by non-Israelis, making the Congress a multinational deliberative body for the Jewish diaspora. However, as aliyah has brought Jews to Israel from other countries, Israeli representation in the legislature has increased at the expense of non-Israeli Jewish diaspora representation. A Brit Olamit (World Union) must have representation in at least five countries to send a delegation to the Congress.

There are currently six Zionist World Unions (with full voting rights):

 World Zionist Union: Labor Zionist Movement – Arzenu – World Union of Meretz
 United Faction: Kadima–HaNoar HaTzioni– MERCAZ
 World Mizrachi/Ichud Le'umi/Herut/Yisrael Beytenu/Moledet/Tkuma
 World Likud/Shas
 Hadassah/Confederation
 Over The Rainbow – the Zionist movement

Israeli representatives

Since the creation of the State of Israel, there are no elections held for Israeli delegates to the  World Zionist Congress. Rather, elections to the Knesset, Israel's parliament, are deemed to fulfill this function, and Zionist parties represented in the Knesset are apportioned a number of Congress delegates proportional to their strength in the Knesset. The late left-wing leader Shulamit Aloni on several occasions criticized this practice, stating that "Most Israeli citizens neither know nor care that when they go to the polls they are among other things also electing delegates to the World Zionist Congress. (...) Had the Zionist Movement been required to do in Israel what it does in other countries - i.e., recruit paying members and get these members to hold specific elections to the World Zionist Congress - there might have been revealed an embarrassing low number of committed Zionists in Israel".

Zionist organizations with special status
Two women's organizations have special status in the Zionist Organization and have full voting rights:

 WIZO – is an international, non-party Zionist body, which receives global representation by virtue of an agreement entered into in 1964. 
 Hadassah – received special status by virtue of a decision of the Zionist General Council, in 1994.

International Jewish organizations
The international Jewish organizations have also been represented in the Zionist Congress since 1972, provided that they accept the Jerusalem Program, even if not all their members are declared Zionists. These bodies have limited voting rights they do not vote on matters of candidature and elections to the institutions of the WZO.

The following are the International Jewish Organizations (limited voting rights):
 Bnai Brith International
 Maccabi World Union
 Na'amat
 WIZO Women's International Zionist Organization
 World Council of Conservative Masorti Synagogues
 World Emunah
 World Organization of Orthodox Synagogues & Communities in Israel and the Diaspora
 World Sephardi Federation
 World Union for Progressive Judaism
 World Union of Jewish Students
 Zionist Council in Israel

Other participants in Congress (advisors, observers)
 In addition to the delegates with full voting rights participating in Congress, there are also participants in an advisory capacity which can participate in debates but have no voting rights. These may consist of office holders such as members of the Zionist Executive, members of the Zionist General Council who were not elected as delegates to Congress, Chairs of the Zionist Federations, judicial office holders - the President of the Zionist Supreme Court, the Attorney, the Comptroller and representatives of the Aliyah Movement.
 Observers with no speaking or voting rights can be invited by the Zionist Executive or the Congress Presidium.

Former participants
 Green Zionist Alliance

The course of the Congress
The Zionist Congress is conducted by the Congress Presidium. Congress deliberations are divided into five stages:
 Opening of the Congress, including a speech by the Chairman of the Executive, and other speeches determined in the agenda, election of the Congress Presidium, the report of the President of the Zionist Supreme Court on the election results, reports of the members of the Zionist Executive in supplement to the printed report, election of the Congress committees.
 Election of the new Executive, according to the proposal of the Congress Standing Committee.
 Meetings of the committees.
 Reports of the committees and voting on the draft resolutions presented by them. The report of the Standing Committee and voting on its proposals for members of the Zionist General Council, the Comptroller and the Legal Institutions.
 Congress closing ceremony.

History
The Zionist Congress, later to become the World Zionist Congress, was held at intervals of 1 year (1897–1901), then 2 years (1903–1939) until the outbreak of the Second World War, with an eight-year break (1913–1921) due to the First World War.

Important moments
 The First Zionist Congress, held in 1897 in Basel, Switzerland, had Theodor Herzl acting as chairperson. The Congress was attended by some 200 participants who formulated the Zionist platform, known as the "Basel programme", and established the Zionist Organization (ZO). In contrast with the older Hibbat Zion movement, the ZO took a clear stance in favour of political Zionism, stating in its programme that
"Zionism seeks for the Jewish people a publicly recognized legally secured homeland in Palestine."
Herzl wrote in his diary,
"Were I to sum up the Basel Congress in a word - which I shall guard against pronouncing publicly - it would be this: At Basel I founded the Jewish State."

 The Twenty-third Zionist Congress, held in 1951 in  Jerusalem, was the first to be held after the establishment of the State of Israel, and the first held in Jerusalem, which would become the norm. It was opened at the graveside of Theodor Herzl, whose remains had been moved from Vienna and reburied on the top of a hill in Jerusalem that was renamed after him, Mount Herzl. The Congress issued the "Jerusalem Program", placing its main focus on the newly created state as the central unifying element for the Jewish people.
 Ruth Popkin was the first woman to be Chair of the Presidium and President of the World Zionist Congress, being elected to both positions in 1987.

See also
 First Zionist Congress
 Sixth Zionist Congress
 World Zionist Organization
 Jewish Agency for Israel

References

External links
 
 

 
Zionist organizations
1897 establishments in Europe
Jewish Agency for Israel
Governance
Theodor Herzl

hy:Հրեական համաշխարհային վեհաժողով